Mia Farrance (born 1 December 1973 in Melbourne) is an Australian slalom canoeist who competed at the international level from 1988 to 2004. She finished 14th in the K1 event at the 1996 Summer Olympics in Atlanta.

Her older brother Andrew is also a former slalom canoeist.

World Cup individual podiums

References

1973 births
Australian female canoeists
Canoeists at the 1996 Summer Olympics
Living people
Olympic canoeists of Australia
Sportspeople from Melbourne